Samuel Che Glenfield (born 10 May 2005) is a Northern Irish professional footballer who plays for Fleetwood Town, as a forward.

Club career
Glenfield started his career in the youth system at Portadown and went on to make his first team debut at just 15 years of age on 24 October 2020, when he came on as a substitute in the 3–0 defeat to Coleraine at Shamrock Park. In the summer of 2021, he signed his first professional contract, a three year deal, to keep him at the club until 2024.

On 8 August 2022, he signed for EFL League One side Fleetwood Town and was immediately placed into the under-18 squad. Sixteen days after signing for the club, he was promoted to new manager, Scott Brown's, first team squad for the 0–0 draw against Derby County, but he remained an unused substitute. He made his first team debut on 23 August 2022, when he replaced Cian Hayes as a substitute in the EFL Cup second round 1–0 defeat to Premier League side Everton at Highbury Stadium.

International career
Glenfield has represented Northern Ireland at under-16 and under-17 levels.

Career statistics

References

External links
 

2005 births
Living people
Association footballers from Northern Ireland
Association football midfielders
NIFL Premiership players
Portadown F.C. players
Fleetwood Town F.C. players